Richard Fehr (15 July 1939 – 30 June 2013) was the seventh Chief Apostle (international church president) of the New Apostolic Church from 22 May 1988 to 15 May 2005.

Life
Richard Fehr originally worked as a typesetter and married his wife on 8 September 1960. They had one son.

Term in office

He was ordained Chief Apostle by his predecessor Hans Urwyler at his bedside in the hospital.  Because of the severe disease which made Chief Apostle Hans Urwyler unfit for service in July 1987, he entrusted Richard Fehr with his substitution and ordained him Chief Apostle Helper on 28 August 1987. On 3 May 1988, Fehr was ordained Chief Apostle by the very ill Urwyler. Fehr officially assumed this office on 22 May 1988 in Fellbach, Germany.

Fehr later ordained Wilhelm Leber his successor on 15 May 2005 in Fellbach and officially asked him for his own retirement.

Health deterioration and death
Since the end of this mandate, he started to experience some health problems.
In 2010 he suffered a stroke, which resulted in partial paralysis. After a short time of rehabilitation he progressed a little, in words of Leber.

Finally, he died on the evening of 30 June 2013.

External links
 Image of Richard Fehr

Swiss Christian religious leaders
1939 births
Members of the New Apostolic Church
2013 deaths